Bulgarian Sign Language (in Bulgarian: "български жестомимичен език (БЖЕ)") is the language, or perhaps languages, of the deaf community in Bulgaria. 

Primary schools were established for the deaf. Russian Sign Language was introduced in 1910, and allowed in the classroom in 1945, and Wittmann (1991) classifies it as a descendant of Russian Sign. However, Bickford (2005) found that Bulgarian Sign formed a cluster with Slovak, Czech, Hungarian, Romanian, and Polish Sign. The language of the classroom is different from that used by adults outside, and it is not clear if Wittmann and Bickford looked at the same language; nor, if one is derived from Russian Sign, if it is a dialect or if it creolized to form a new language.

References

Languages of Bulgaria
French Sign Language family